Diego Nahuel Casoppero (born 27 November 1998) is an Argentine professional footballer who plays as a midfielder for Comunicaciones.

Career
Casoppero got his senior career underway in Primera B Metropolitana with Comunicaciones. His first appearance arrived on 12 September 2017 in a 0–2 win over Estudiantes, with a further seven matches following before he scored his opening goals - as he netted a brace in a victory away to San Miguel on 2 February 2018. In total, Casoppero featured thirteen times in the 2017–18 campaign.

Career statistics
.

References

External links

1998 births
Living people
Place of birth missing (living people)
Argentine footballers
Association football midfielders
Primera B Metropolitana players
Club Comunicaciones footballers